James Christie may refer to:

 James Christie (auctioneer) (1730–1803), founder of Christie's
 James Christie the Younger (1773–1833), auctioneer and antiquary, son of the founder of Christie's
 James Christie (New Zealand) (born 1869), soldier in the Boer War
 James Christie (British politician) (1873–1958), British Conservative Party Member of Parliament 1929–1945
 James Christie (Manitoba politician) (1891–1953), Liberal-Progressive representative in the Legislative Assembly of Manitoba 1932–1953
 James Cope Christie (1894–?), architect in Johannesburg and Rhodesia
 James David Christie (born 1952), American organist